The Brisbane to Gladstone yacht race is held annually, starting on Good Friday. The premier blue water classic begins from Shorncliffe in Moreton Bay, Queensland, Australia, and finishes in Gladstone Harbour. Yachts compete for the Courier Mail Cup, one of the oldest perpetual trophies in Australia that has been competed for on a continual basis.

In 2009 as part of the Q150 celebrations, the Brisbane to Gladstone Yacht Race was announced as one of the Q150 Icons of Queensland for its role as an "event and festival".

History 
The Queensland Cruising Yacht Club was established in 1948 to organise the Brisbane to Gladstone Yacht Race. The first race was held during Easter 1949. The first race saw seven vessels start, two of which carried radios while Brisbane’s Homing Pigeon Club supplied pigeons to the others for position reporting. Each yacht issued with birds was to release two each day.

The finish is hosted by the Port Curtis Sailing Club.

Course
The course leads the yachts northwards from the start line at the Shorncliffe pier to a turning mark off Redcliffe before joining the main channel out of Moreton Bay. Yachts leave Fraser Island to port before passing Breaksea spit and then leaving Lady Elliot Island to port. The final stage of the race is often the hardest as the yachts make their way up Gladstone Harbour to the finish line just outside Auckland Creek.

Winners

Key
  Skandia's race record of 20 hours, 24 minutes, 50 seconds
  Most Line Honors wins – Apollo
  Most Courier Mail Cup wins – Saltash II
  Most PHRF/THCF Handicap wins - Norseman
  Most IRC Handicap wins - Saltash II
  Most IOR Handicap wins - Saltash II
  Most IMS Handicap wins - Saltash II
  Most Arbitrary Handicap wins - Helena/Enid Tie
  Most Cruising Handicap wins – Fortitude

Consecutive participation
Laurabada raced 51 Brisbane to Gladstone Yacht races, sailing 43 with her builder Ivan Holm Snr at the helm and 8 races with Ivan Holm Jnr as skipper. The majestic ketch contested her 50th race in 2002 and 51st race in 2018.  Wistari has now sailed 52 Brisbane to Gladstone Yacht Races as of 2022, sailing 28 with her designer and builder Noel Patrick at the helm and 24 with son Scott Patrick as skipper.

Multiple Courier Mail Cup winners
 Saltash II (Ian and Bill Wright) 1986, 1992, 1993, 1999, 2001, 2003, 2005, 2007
 Fastest corrected time, 1993: 21 hours 15 minutes 54 seconds (race record)
 Average handicap rated speed: 14.48 knots
 Norseman (A Wilson) 1951, 1952, 1954, 1955, 1956 (Handicap)
 Fastest corrected time 1955: 29 h 5 min 06 s
 Wistari (Noel Patrick, Scott Patrick) 1971, 1976, 1977, 1982, 2021
 Fastest corrected time 1976: 26 h 01 min 24 s
 Scampi A (Ross Perrins, Colin Loel) 1984, 1988, 2000
 Fastest corrected time 1988: 28 h 42 min 07 s
 Solo (Vic Meyer) 1958, 1959 (Line Honours and Handicap winner)
 Fastest corrected time 1958: 27 h 48 min 37 s
 Leroy Brown (Warren Wieckmann) 1989, 1991
 Fastest corrected time 1991: 40 h 07 min 24 s
 Mouse Of Malham (Bill Dayan-Smith, Norman R Wright Jnr) 1960, 1963
 Fastest corrected time 1963: 29 h 31 min 24 s
 Quantum Racing (Ray Roberts) 2008, 2009
 Fastest corrected time 2008: 35 h 08 min 44 s
 Wedgetail (Bill Wild) 2010, 2013
 Fastest corrected time 2010: 34 h 44 min 45 s
 Black Jack no.77 (Peter Harburg) 2015, 2016 Fastest corrected time 2015: 50 h 55 min 11 s

Multiple winning skippers
 Jack Rooklyn (Apollo) 1973, 1974, 1978, 1979 (Ballyhoo) 1975 (Maxi Apollo) 1982, 1983, 1984
 Fastest elapsed time 1982, Maxi Apollo: 29 hours 46 minutes 56 seconds
 Fred Markwell (Alvis) 1952, 1953, 1954, 1956,1957
 Fastest elapsed time 1956: 48 h 29 min 29 s
 Vic Meyer (Solo)1958, 1959, 1960, 1962, 1963
 Fastest elapsed time 1958: 34 h 52 min 50 s
 Arthur Bloore (The Office) 1985, (Hammer Of Queensland) 1988, 1991, 1996, 1998
 Fastest elapsed time 1988: 29 h 53 min 47 s
 Sean Langman (Grundig Xena, Grundig, AAPT - all the same boat) 2001, 2002, 2003, 2005
 Fastest elapsed time 2004: 20 h 36 min 48 s
 Kerry Spencer (Bobsled) 1992, 1993, 1995
 Fastest elapsed time 1993: 21 h 59 min 43 seconds
 Mark Bradford (Black Jack – two different boats with the same name) 2012, 2015, 2016
 Fastest correct time 2012: 36 h 15 min 56 s
 Rupert Murdoch (Ilina) 1964, 1965
 Fastest elapsed time 1964: 33 h 23 min 54 s
 Robert Bird (Bobsled) co-skipper 1993, 1995
 Fastest elapsed time 1993: 21 h 59 min 43 s
 Bill Wild (Wedgetail) 2010, 2013
 Fastest correct time 2010: 34 h 44 min 45 s

Fastest time to complete the course 
Black Jack 100
 2018 course time: 16h 53min 57s
 Average speed: 18.23 knots

See also 

 Sport in Queensland

References

External links

 

Gladstone, Queensland
Recurring sporting events established in 1949
Sailing competitions in Australia
Sport in Brisbane
Sports competitions in Queensland